Acacia saxicola, commonly known as Mount Maroon wattle, is a shrub belonging to the genus Acacia and the subgenus Phyllodineae native to eastern Australia.

Description
The branchlets have a rounded cross section. Like most species of Acacia the shrub has phyllodes rather than true leaves. The crowded but scattered evergreen phyllodes are patent to inclined with a lanceolate to narrowly triangular shape that is straight to shallowly recurved. When it blooms it produces inflorescences that occur singly along rudimentary racemes. The dark brown pods are irregularly undulate, dark brown and contain longitudinally arranged seeds.

Taxonomy
The species was first described by the botanist Leslie Pedley in 1969 as part of the work Notes on Acacia, chiefly from Queensland as published in Contributions from the Queensland Herbarium. It was reclassified as Racosperma saxicola in 1987 by Pedley then transferred back to genus Acacia in 2001.
The shrub resembles both Acacia ulicifolia and Acacia brachycarpa but has wider phyllodes and shorter flower stalks.

Distribution
It is mostly found in pockets of soil found in the crevices of the rocks.

See also
 List of Acacia species

References

saxicola
Flora of Queensland
Plants described in 1969
Taxa named by Leslie Pedley